Batman Forever: Music from the Motion Picture is the 1995 soundtrack to the motion picture Batman Forever.

Background 
Only five of the songs are actually featured in the movie. Hit singles from the soundtrack include "Hold Me, Thrill Me, Kiss Me, Kill Me" by U2 and "Kiss from a Rose" by Seal, both of which were nominated for MTV Movie Awards. "Kiss from a Rose" (whose video was also directed by Joel Schumacher) reached No. 1 in the U.S. charts as well. The soundtrack itself, featuring additional songs by the Flaming Lips, Brandy, the Offspring (songs also included in the film), Method Man, Nick Cave, Michael Hutchence (of INXS), PJ Harvey, and Massive Attack, was an attempt to (in producer Peter MacGregor-Scott's words) make the film more "pop". The soundtrack was hugely successful, selling almost as many copies as Prince's soundtrack to the 1989 Batman film. A second album, featuring over 40 minutes of Elliot Goldenthal's Original Motion Picture Score, was released two weeks after the soundtrack album.

Accolades
In 1996, "Kiss from a Rose" won three Grammy Awards for Best Male Pop Vocal Performance, Record of the Year and Song of the Year.

Track listing 
"Hold Me, Thrill Me, Kiss Me, Kill Me" by U2 – 4:46
"One Time Too Many" by PJ Harvey – 2:52
"Where Are You Now?" by Brandy – 3:57
"Kiss from a Rose" by Seal – 3:38
"The Hunter Gets Captured by the Game" by Massive Attack and Tracey Thorn (The Marvelettes cover) – 4:06
"Nobody Lives Without Love" by Eddi Reader – 5:05
"Tell Me Now" by Mazzy Star – 4:17
"Smash It Up" by the Offspring (The Damned cover) – 3:26
"There Is a Light" by Nick Cave – 4:23
"The Riddler" by Method Man – 3:30
"The Passenger" by Michael Hutchence (Iggy Pop cover) – 4:37
"Crossing the River" by the Devlins – 4:45
"8" by Sunny Day Real Estate – 5:27
"Bad Days" by the Flaming Lips – 4:39

Charts

Weekly charts

Year-end charts

Certifications and sales

Personnel
Executive Producers: Jolene Cherry, Joel Schumacher and Gary LeMel
Project Supervisor: Leslie Reed
Executive in Charge of Product Development for Atlantic: Michael Krumper
Mastered by TAT with help from Stephen Marcussen at Precision Mastering, Hollywood, CA
Executive in Charge of Music for Warner Bros: Gary LeMel 
Executive in Charge of Everything Else: Tom Lassally 
Production Assistant: Melanie Davidson
Music Legal Services by Jeffrey Taylor Light and Ira Selsky of Myman, Abell, Fineman, Greenspan & Rowan
Photography: Herb Ritts and Ralph Nelson
Art Direction: Larry Freemantle

References 

1995 soundtrack albums
Albums produced by Bono
Albums produced by Nellee Hooper
Albums produced by RZA
Albums produced by the Edge
Atlantic Records soundtracks
Batman (1989 film series)
Batman film soundtracks
Warner Records soundtracks
1990s film soundtrack albums